11F or 11f may refer to:
 GCR Class 11F, a class of British 4-4-0 steam locomotive
Kepler-11f, an exoplanet orbiting the star Kepler-11

See also
F11 (disambiguation)